William Blackwell Branch (September 11, 1927 – November 3, 2019) was an American playwright who was also involved in many aspects of entertainment, including journalism, media production, editing, a short-lived career acting for television as well as talking on the radio. He "wrote, directed, and produced extensively for the stage, television, radio, and his own media consulting and production firm".

Early life and education 
Branch was born on September 11, 1927, to James Matthew Branch, an African Methodist Episcopal Zion minister, and Iola Douglas Branch, in New Haven, Connecticut. 

Branch attended high schools in Charlotte, North Carolina, and Washington, D.C. He went on to earn his undergraduate degree in Science at Northwestern University in 1949, then continued his education at Columbia University, graduating with his M.F.A. in dramatic arts in 1958. Branch later studied at Yale University, after which he taught at Cornell University and William Paterson College from 1994 to 1996, before beginning a career in entertainment, focusing specifically on drama.

Career and themes 

Branch involved himself in the entertainment world because he "became convinced that only African Americans could truthfully write and produce theater about African Americans." His first play was A Medal for Willie, written when he was 27. It launched Branch's career, leading to success and much recognition for his work. His writing characteristically "deals with the place and recognition of the African American in pre-civil rights America." He pointed out how American society was flawed in its treatment African Americans, and "the irony of the black soldier fighting for the freedom of others in another country and yet being denied those same basic freedoms and rights in his own country." Branch also highlighted racial stereotypes, allowing audiences to see the lies behind the stereotypes about African Americans.

Other issues featured in his work include feminism and familial relations. His play Baccalaureate: Drama in Three Acts is about a young African-American female in a middle-class family, discussing the struggles she faces when it came to education. Through his plays, such as In Splendid Error (1954) which tells in part the story of Frederick Douglass and his relationship with John Brown, A Wreath for Udomo (1961), Fifty Steps Toward Freedom (1970), and A Medal for Willie (1985), Branch explored and demonstrated societal problems in the unfair treatment of African Americans. He explained through these plays how wrongly African Americans were represented and the struggles they had within the middle class.

After beginning his career as a playwright, Branch went on to become involved in films. In 1968 he produced Still a Brother: Inside the Black Middle Class in 1968, which touched on similar themes as those in his plays. Due to Branch's beliefs in African-American culture and who he thought was suitable to truthfully produce and project this culture to the public, he began to write and direct films to display his culture in a truthful manner.  Branch remained a playwright following World War II, creating pieces that were seen as dramas.

Branch believed in telling the truth of African-American culture, arguing that only African Americans can tell the stories of how they were treated or represented.

Awards and recognition 

Branch was awarded for several different areas of his work. Branch was awarded the Guggenheim Fellowship grant for playwriting. Along with this award Branch received "a Robert E. Sherwood Television Award; and a citation from the National Conference of Christians and Jews (NCCJ)-the latter two are for his NBC television drama Light in the Southern Sky… Other honors included an American Film Festival Blue Ribbon Award and an Emmy nomination shared with fellow producer William Greaves for the PBS documentary film Still a Brother: Inside the Negro Middle Class and an NCCJ Citation for his PBS drama A Letter from Booker T…. Although Branch received awards and nominations he was noted for much of his other work, discussing racial, societal, and class issues as well as other topics that were not awarded or nominated.

Selected work

Plays 
 A Medal for Willie, 1951.
 In Splendid Error, 1954.
 Light in the Southern Sky, 1958.
 To Follow the Phoenix, 1960.
 A Wreath for Udomo, 1961.
 Baccalaureate, 1975.

Television writing 
 This Way, ABC, 1955
 What Is Conscience?, CBS, 1955
 Let's Find Out, National Council of Church, 1956
 Light in the Southern Sky, NBC, 1958
 'Legacy of 'a Prophet, Educational Broadcasting Corp., 1959
 The City (documentary series), Educational Broadcasting Corp., 1962–64
 Still a Brother: Inside the Black Middle Class, NET, 1968
 The Case of NON-Working Workers, NBC, 1972
 The 20 Billion-Dollar-Rip-Off, NBC, 1972
 No Room to Run, No Place to Hide, NBC, 1972
 The Black Church in New York, NBC, 1973.
 Afro-American Perspectives (series), PBS, 1973–74.
 A Letter from Booker T., PBS, 1987.

 Films 
 Fifty Steps Toward Freedom, 1959.
 The Man on the Meeting Street, 1960.
 Benefit Performance, 1969.
 Judgement!, 1969.
 Together for Days, 1971.

 Producer 
 "NBC News," NBC, 1959-60.
 The City (documentary series), Educational Broadcasting Corp., 1962–64
 Still a Brother: Inside the Black Middle Class, 1968
 Black Perspectives on the News, PBS, 1978–79 (Executive Producer)

Editor
 Black Thunder: An Anthology of Contemporary African American Drama, Mentor, 1992.
 

Criticism

Anthologies
 Black Theatre: A 20th Century Collection of the Work of Its Best Playwrights, edited by Lindsey Patterson, Dodd-Mead, 1971
    (reissue New American Library, 1986)
 Black Theatre USA: 45 Plays by Black Americans, 1847-1974, edited by J. Hatch, Free Press, 1974
 Standing Room Only, edited by Daigon and Bernier, Prentice-Hall, 1977
 Meeting Challenges, edited by J. Nelson, American Book, 1980
 

 Books 
 (Editor and contributor) Black Thunder: An Anthology of Contemporary African American Drama, Mentor, 1992.
 (Editor and contributor) Crosswinds: An Anthology of Black Dramatists in the Diaspora, Indiana University Press, 1993.

 References 

Further reading
 Andrews, William L. “The Advent of Urban Realism.” Encyclopædia Britannica Online. Encyclopædia Britannica, 2015. Retrieved October 28, 2015.
 Hay, Samuel A. “African-American Drama, 1950-1970*.” ProQuest Information and Learning Company, 2003. Print.
 Laverne Luster. "William Blackwell Branch (1927- )", in Nelson, Emmanuel S. (ed.), African American Dramatists: An A-to-Z Guide. Westport: Greenwood, 2004. Print.
 "William (Blackwell) Branch Biography". Bookrags. Thomson Corporation, 2005. Retrieved November 2, 2015.

 Bissell, James D. "Film Reference." William B. Branch Biography (1927-). Advameg, Inc. Retrieved November 19, 2015.

External links

"William B Branch", Fandango"William Branch", Black World/Negro Digest'', January 1968.

1927 births
2019 deaths
20th-century American dramatists and playwrights
African-American dramatists and playwrights
African-American screenwriters
African-American television producers
American Book Award winners
Columbia University alumni
Cornell University faculty
Northwestern University alumni
William Paterson University faculty
Writers from New Haven, Connecticut
Yale University alumni
20th-century African-American writers
21st-century African-American people